In horticulture, lime sulphur (American spelling lime sulfur) is mainly a mixture of calcium polysulfides and thiosulfate (plus other reaction by-products as sulfite and sulfate) formed by reacting calcium hydroxide with elemental sulfur, used in pest control. It can be prepared by boiling in water a suspension of poorly soluble calcium hydroxide (lime) and solid sulfur together with a small amount of surfactant to facilitate the dispersion of these solids in water. After elimination of any residual solids (flocculation, decantation and filtration), it is normally used as an aqueous solution, which is reddish-yellow in colour and has a distinctive offensive odour of hydrogen sulfide (H2S, rotten eggs).

Synthesis reaction

The exact chemical reaction leading to the synthesis of lime sulfur is poorly known and is generally written as:

as reported in a document of the US Department of Agriculture (USDA).

This vague reaction is puzzling because it involves the reduction of elemental sulfur and no reductant appears in the above mentioned equation while sulfur oxidation products are also mentioned. The initial pH of the solution imposed by poorly soluble hydrated lime is alkaline (pH = 12.5) while the final pH is in range 11–12, typical for sulfides which are also strong bases.

When the hydrolysis of calcium sulfide is accounted for, the individual reactions for each of the by-products are:

 
 
 

However, elemental sulfur can undergo a disproportionation reaction, also called dismutation. The first reaction resembles a disproportionation reaction. The inverse comproportionation reaction is the reaction occurring in the Claus process used for desulfurisation of oil and gas crude products in the refining industry:

 +   →  + 

By rewriting the last reaction in the inverse direction one obtains a reaction consistent with what is observed in the lime sulfur global reaction:

  + 2  → 2  + 

In alkaline conditions, it gives:

 

and after simplification, or more exactly recycling, of water molecules in the above reaction:

 

adding back 6 Ca2+ cations from hydrated lime for the sake of electroneutrality, one obtains the global reaction.

This last reaction is consistent with the global lime sulfur reaction mentioned in the USDA document. However, it does not account of all the details, a.o., the production of thiosulfate and sulfate amongst the end-products of the reaction. Meanwhile, it is a good first order approximation and it usefully highlights the overall lime sulfur reaction scheme because the chemistry of reduced or partially oxidized forms of sulfur is particularly complex and all the intermediate steps or involved mechanisms are hard to unravel. Moreover, once exposed to atmospheric oxygen and microbial activity, the lime sulfur system will undergo a fast oxidation and its different products will continue to evolve and finally enter the natural sulfur cycle.

The presence of thiosulfate in the lime sulfur reaction can be accounted by the reaction between sulfite and elemental sulfur (or with sulfide and polysulfides) and that of sulfate by the complete oxidation of sulfite or thiosulfate following a more complex reaction scheme. More information on calcium thiosulfate production has been described in a patent registered by Hajjatie et al. (2006).

Hajjatie et al. (2006) wrote the lime sulfur reaction in various ways depending on the degree of polymerisation of calcium polysulfides, but the following reaction is probably the simplest of their series:

where the S22– species corresponds to the disulfide anion –S–S– (with a covalent bond between the 2 sulfur atoms) also present in pyrite (FeS2), a Fe(II) disulfide mineral.

They also managed to successfully control this reaction to achieve the conversion of elemental sulfur in a quasi pure solution of calcium thiosulfate.

Preparation of lime sulfur 
A New York State Agricultural Experiment Station recipe for the concentrate is 80 lb. of sulfur, 36 lb. of quicklime, and 50 gal. of water. Transferring this formula to the metric system and using a total volume as 100 L of purified water to this we will add 19.172 kg of sulphur and 8.627 kg of calcium oxide. About 2.2:1 is the ratio (by weight) for compounding sulfur and quicklime; this makes the highest proportion of calcium pentasulfide.  If calcium hydroxide (builders or hydrated lime) is used, an increase by 1/3 or more (to 115 g/L or more) might be used with the 192 g/L of sulfur.  If the quicklime is 85%, 90%, or 95% pure, use 101 g/L, 96 g/L, or 91 g/L; if impure hydrated lime is used, similarly increase its quantity.  Avoid using lime that is less than 90% pure.  Boil for an hour, stirring and adding small amounts of hot water to compensate for evaporation.

Use 
In agriculture and horticulture, lime sulfur is sold as a spray to control fungi, bacteria and insects. On deciduous trees it can be sprayed during the winter on the surface of the bark in high concentrations, but as lime sulfur can burn foliage, it must be heavily diluted before spraying onto herbaceous crops, especially during warm weather. Lime Sulphur is approved for use on organic crops in the European Union and the United Kingdom.

Bonsai enthusiasts use undiluted lime sulfur to bleach, sterilise, and preserve deadwood on bonsai trees while giving an aged look. Rather than spraying the entire tree, as with the pesticidal usage, lime sulfur is painted directly onto the exposed deadwood, and is often colored with a small amount of dark paint to make it look more natural. Without paint pigments, the lime-sulfur solution bleaches wood to a bone-white color that takes time to weather and become natural-looking. In the very specific case of the bonsai culture, if the lime sulfur is carefully and very patiently applied by hand with a small brush and does not enter into direct contact with the leaves or needles, this technique can be used on evergreen bonsai trees as well as other types of green trees. However, this does not apply for a normal use on common trees with green leaves.

Diluted solutions of lime sulfur (between 1:16 and 1:32) are also used as a dip for pets to help control ringworm (fungus), mange and other dermatoses and parasites. Undiluted lime sulfur is corrosive to skin and eyes and can cause serious injury like blindness.

Safety 
Lime sulfur reacts with strong acids (including stomach acid) to produce highly toxic hydrogen sulfide (rotten egg gas) and indeed usually has a distinct "rotten egg" odor to it. Lime sulfur is not extremely flammable but combustion produces highly irritating sulfur dioxide gas.

Safety goggles and impervious gloves must be worn while handling lime sulfur. Lime sulfur solutions are strongly alkaline (typical commercial concentrates have a pH over 11.5 because of the presence of dissolved sulfides and hydroxide anions), and are harmful for living organisms and can cause blindness if splashed in the eyes.

The corrosive nature of lime sulfur is due to the reduced species of sulfur it contains, in particular the sulfides responsible for stress corrosion cracking and the thiosulphates causing pitting corrosion. Localised corrosion by the reduced species of sulfur can be dramatic, even the mere presence of elemental sulfur in contact with metals is enough to corrode them considerably, including so-called stainless steels.

History 
Lime sulfur is believed to be the earliest synthetic chemical used as a pesticide, being used in the 1840s in France to control grape vine powdery mildew Uncinula necator, which had been introduced from the USA in 1845 and reduced wine production by 80%. In 1886 it was first used in California to control San Jose scale. Commencing around 1904, commercial suppliers began to manufacturer lime sulfur; prior to that time, gardeners were expected to manufacture their own. By the 1920s essentially all commercial orchards in western countries were protected by regular spraying with lime sulfur. However by the 1940s, lime sulfur began to be replaced by synthetic organic fungicides which risked less damage to the crop's foliage.

See also

 Claus process

References

Notes

Bibliography

"Chemical Investigation of Best Conditions for Making the Lime-Sulfur Wash."  L.L. Van Slyke, A.W. Bosworth, & C.C. Hedges, New York Agricultural Experiment Station Bulletin No. 329, December 1910, Geneva, New York

External links
 Chronological History of the Development of Insecticides and Control Equipment from 1854 through 1954
 Background on History of Pesticide Use and Regulation in the United States, Part Two (PDF, 54 kB).
  The Value of Fungicides in U.S. Crop Production, (PDF, 1.1 MB)

Pest control
Fungicides
Insecticides
Calcium compounds
Sulfur compounds
Alchemical substances